Nizhniye Isady is a rural locality (a village) in Beryozovsky District, Perm Krai, Russia. The population was 42 as of 2010.

Geography 
Nizhniye Isady is located 26 km northeast of  Beryozovka (the district's administrative centre) by road. Verkhniye Isady is the nearest rural locality.

References 

Rural localities in Beryozovsky District, Perm Krai